Ronald Thomas (born 1954) is an American cellist known for his work as a soloist and chamber musician. Thomas has made guest appearances with some of the world's finest orchestras including the Philadelphia Orchestra, the Saint Louis Symphony Orchestra, the Baltimore Symphony Orchestra, the Seattle Symphony Orchestra, the Hong Kong Philharmonic, the Handel and Haydn Society, the Pro Arte Chamber Orchestra of Boston, and the Blossom Festival Orchestra among others. He has played recitals in nearly every state including performances in the cities of New York, Washington, D.C., Boston, and Los Angeles. Thomas has also performed throughout Europe and Asia.

Biography 
Thomas first studied cello with Mary Canberg before attending the New England Conservatory of Music and the Curtis Institute in Philadelphia where his principal teachers were Lorne Munroe and David Soyer. He first drew recognition when he won the Young Concert Artists International Auditions in 1974 at the age of nineteen. Since then he has appeared as a soloist with major orchestras both in the United States and internationally.

Ronald Thomas is currently the Principal Cellist of the St. Paul Chamber orchestra, a position he has held since 2005. Thomas is the former co-founder and artistic director of the Boston Chamber Music Society, where he spent 26 years performing and directing until 2009. He has also appeared with the Seattle Chamber Music Society and the Chamber Music Society of Lincoln Center both at Alice Tully Hall and on tour. Other chamber music appearances include the La Musica, Music@Menlo, Sarasota Music Festival, Music from Angel Fire, Music in the Mountains, Portland Chamber Music Festival, Santa Fe Chamber Music Festival, Bravo! Vail Valley Music Festival, Festival dei Due Mondi, Blossom Music Festival, Chamber Music Northwest, Sarasota Music Festival, the Norfolk Chamber Music Festival, the Dubrovnik Festival, Edinburgh Festival, Amsterdam Festival, and others.

Thomas is the artistic director of Chestnut Hill Concerts of Madison, CT and was an original member of the Players in Residence committee and the Board of Overseers at Bargemusic in New York City.  Thomas is also a former member of Boston Musica Viva and the Aeolian Chamber Players.  While a member of these two groups, Thomas premiered countless new works, including those by Gunther Schuller, Michael Colgrass, Ellen Taaffe Zwilich, Donald Erb, William Bolcom, and William Thomas McKinley.

Thomas is a former member of the faculties at M.I.T., Brown University, the Boston Conservatory and the Peabody Conservatory of Music in Baltimore where he spent nine years before resigning in 1997 in order to spend more time with his then new daughter, Caitlin, and the cello. Thomas is married to violist Cynthia Phelps and they live just outside New York City in Leonia, N.J., while Mr. Thomas maintains a secondary residence in St. Paul, MN. They have three daughters: Lili (by Thomas' marriage to Mihae Lee), Christina (by Phelps' marriage to baritone David Malis), and Caitlin.

References 

American classical cellists
Living people
1954 births